Len Davis (born August 6, 1964) is a former New Orleans police officer. He was convicted of depriving civil rights through murder by conspiring with an assassin to kill a local resident.

Police career
Davis was known in the community as "RoboCop" because of his large size and the "Desire terrorist" due to his aggressive policing style. He had been suspended six times and received 20 complaints between 1987 and 1992 while subsequently receiving the department's Medal of Merit in 1993.

In 1994, an FBI sting caught Davis enforcing a protection racket upon the city's cocaine dealers. Davis had extorted protection money from a drug dealer who was an FBI informant. Nine other police officers, including two who would later testify against Davis, were later indicted for being part of a criminal conspiracy with Davis. Twenty additional New Orleans police officers were also implicated in the scheme but the investigation had to be aborted due to the murder of Kim Groves. Davis would later be convicted of additional drug-related charges while the other officers pleaded guilty.

Murder of Kim Groves 
In 1994, Davis beat a young man in New Orleans, mistaking him for a suspect in a police officer's shooting. Kim Groves, a 32-year old local resident and mother of three young children, witnessed the assault and filed a complaint with the New Orleans Police Department. Davis was tipped off about the complaint by another officer and then conspired with a local drug dealer, Paul Hardy, to kill Groves. Hardy shot and killed her on October 14, 1994, less than one day after she filed the complaint. A third man, Damon Causey, hid the murder weapon, a 9 mm pistol.

Trial and conviction
Davis was convicted in 1996 on two federal civil rights charges for directing Hardy to murder Groves and for witness tampering. Davis was initially sentenced to death on April 26, 1996. The Fifth Circuit, however, reversed his death sentence when his conviction for witness tampering was thrown out. A subsequent jury also chose the death penalty for Davis, and he was formally sentenced to death again on October 27, 2005. Davis is currently on federal death row and is imprisoned in United States Penitentiary, Terre Haute, Indiana.

Hardy was convicted of conspiracy to violate Groves' civil rights and of witness tampering. The witness tampering conviction would be later overturned. He was initially sentenced to death, but in 2011 his sentence was commuted to life when he was found by a judge to be intellectually disabled.

Causey was convicted of federal conspiracy charges and violating Groves' civil rights. He was sentenced to life imprisonment after rejecting a plea bargain that instead would have given him six to nine years in prison. His conviction was upheld on appeal.

Aftermath and later developments
In 2018, the city of New Orleans settled a lawsuit with Groves' three children in the sum of $1.5 million.

In October 2022, three men wrongfully convicted of murder, based on false testimony from Davis, were released after 28 years of incarceration. Davis has been linked to that murder as well. Then, in December 2022, another man was released from prison after more than 30 years who was also convicted based on false testimony from Davis.

See also

List of death row inmates in the United States
List of inmates at the United States Penitentiary, Terre Haute
List of killings by law enforcement officers in the United States prior to 2009
Antoinette Frank - another New Orleans police officer on death row

References

Further reading
The Thinnest Blue Line
Fear of retaliation
Len Davis Trial: 1996 | Encyclopedia.com
James Gill: Spinning their wheels on death row
Federal judge recuses herself from ex-cop Len Davis’ case
New Orleans Breaking News, Today's News | WWL Radio
24 Years After New Orleans Officer Had Her Killed, Kim Groves' Children to Receive $1.5M Settlement

1964 births
Living people
1994 murders in the United States
New Orleans Police Department officers
20th-century American criminals
American male criminals
American police officers convicted of murder
American prisoners sentenced to death
Police misconduct in the United States
People convicted of depriving others of their civil rights
People convicted of soliciting murder
People convicted of murder by the United States federal government
Prisoners sentenced to death by the United States federal government